Gerald "Jerry" McGonigle (born ) is a professor of acting and directing at West Virginia University in Morgantown, West Virginia. He is also the artistic director of the West Virginia Public Theatre.

McGonigle trained as a professional actor at the University of Dallas and the American Conservatory Theater in San Francisco. He began his teaching career at Rancho Santiago College where, together with Phillip Beck, he founded the community college's Professional Actors Conservatory in 1986.

McGonigle began teaching at West Virginia University in 1990.  He has acted in and directed theatrical productions and has directed short and independent films. He was a founding board member of the Kposowa Foundation (now Sierra Leone Rising) started by former student Sarah Culberson.

Filmography

References

External links
 
 

West Virginia University faculty
Drama teachers
Living people
Year of birth missing (living people)
American male stage actors
American theatre directors
American film directors